is housed at the Japan Football Museum (:ja:日本サッカーミュージアム), in JFA House in Bunkyo, Tokyo. The Hall aims to celebrate the achievements of the all-time top Japanese football players, managers, and other persons who have been significant figures in the history of the game in Japan.

2005

Kunishige Kamamoto
Ryuichi Sugiyama
Ryuzo Hiraki
Masakatsu Miyamoto
Shigeo Yaegashi

Yuzuru Nozu

Ken Naganuma
Shunichiro Okano
Taizo Kawamoto
Dettmar Cramer
Goro Yamada
Shigemaru Takenokoshi

2006
Toshio Iwatani

Taro Kagawa
Hideo Shinojima
Teizo Takeuchi
Misao Tamai
Masanori Tokita

Hirokazu Ninomiya

Kenzo Yokoyama
Takaji Mori
Teruki Miyamoto
Masashi Watanabe
Aritatsu Ogi

2007
Mitsuo Kamata
Yoshitada Yamaguchi
Hiroshi Katayama

Shigeyoshi Suzuki

2008

Saburo Kawabuchi

Shiro Teshima

2009
Ikuo Matsumoto
Hidetoki Takahashi

2010
Daishiro Yoshimura
Hiroshi Ochiai
Hiroshi Kagawa

Ryozo Suzuki

2011

Christopher W. McDonald

2012
Yasuhiko Okudera
Yoshikazu Nagai

2013

Hans Ooft
Shizuo Takada

2014

Michihiro Ozawa
Mutsuhiko Nomura

2015
Teiichi Matsumaru
Yukio Shimomura
Hiroshi Ninomiya
Kenji Onitake

2016

Zico
Japan national football team at 1936 Summer Olympics

2017
Shu Kamo

2018
Hisashi Kato
Ruy Ramos
Japan national football team at 1968 Summer Olympics

2019
Akira Nishino
Takeshi Okada
Norio Sasaki

2020
Kazushi Kimura
Philippe Troussier

2022
Ivica Osim
Tadatoshi Komine
Michie Ayabe
Tomonori Kitayama

External links
Japan Football Hall of Fame at Japan Football Association

Football in Japan
Association football museums and halls of fame